White v Driver was a case decided in 1809 concerning a challenge to a will on the grounds of insanity. It laid down that if there was a previous history of insanity, the burden of proof lies in proving the sanity of the testator when making the will. The case was decided at Doctor's Commons under civil law, but continues to be quoted in the UK, Australia and in the US as recently as 2010.

Facts of the case

Elizabeth Manning died at the house of Edward Driver in Chadwell St Mary on 26 January 1805, the day after making a will. She left her estate to her nephew, her niece, and to their mother Margaret, who was Driver's wife but had previously been married to Elizabeth's brother, William. Her will excluded her two sisters. She had been advised to make a will by Eliezer Williams who was the curate of Chadwell. She had suffered from periods of insanity during the previous decade. The will was challenged by Manning's sisters on the grounds of her insanity.

The case is usually cited as White v Driver. Hannah White (formerly Manning) was the sister of Elizabeth Manning. Edward and Margaret Driver were the executor and executrix named in the will.

Evidence
The court heard evidence for the plaintiffs that Manning had been earlier confined to the workhouse because of her insanity and had been forced to wear a straitjacket. There had also been complaints that her behaviour created a fire hazard for her neighbours.

The evidence for the defendants was that she had appeared lucid to a bank clerk when withdrawing money a few days before her death. There was also evidence from the curate that she appeared to be lucid when making her will. Other witnesses attested to her lucidity around the time the will was made.

Verdict
The judge (Sir John Nicholl) ruled that where there was a previous history of insanity, the burden of proof rested with defendants to prove that the testator was sane when making the will. In this case, the will itself was reasonable even though it excluded her sisters. There was evidence from a number of witnesses of her lucidity in the days up to her making the will. He therefore ruled that the will was valid.

Notes

1809 in case law
English case law
1809 in British law
Wills and trusts in the United Kingdom